The 2007 ACC Twenty20 Cup was played from 27 October until 2 November 2007 in Kuwait.

The ten competing teams were: Afghanistan, Hong Kong,  Kuwait, Malaysia, Nepal, Oman, Qatar, Saudi Arabia, Singapore and the UAE.

Group stage

Group A
Group A saw eventual finalists Oman and Afghanistan finish in the top two and qualify for the semi-final stage. Malaysia failed to win a match, despite featuring Somerset player Arul Suppiah in their squad.

Group B
Group B was a closer group than Group A. The UAE topped the group after winning all four of their games, and hosts Kuwait joined them in the semi-finals after finishing ahead of Singapore.

Semi-finals

3rd place play-off

Final

Final standings

See also

ACC Twenty20 Cup
ACC Trophy

References

External links

International cricket in 2007-08

ACC Twenty20 Cup
International cricket competitions in Kuwait
ACC Twenty20 Cup
2007 in Kuwaiti sport